Haicheng Township is a township under the administration of Zhaodong, Heilongjiang, China. , it has 7 villages under its administration.

References 

Township-level divisions of Heilongjiang
Zhaodong